Simon Atai (born 19 September 1999) is a Papua New Guinean cricketer. In December 2017, he was named in Papua New Guinea's squad for the 2018 Under-19 Cricket World Cup. He was the leading run-scorer for Papua New Guinea in the tournament, with 116 runs in six matches.

In April 2019, he was named in Papua New Guinea's squad for the 2019 ICC World Cricket League Division Two tournament in Namibia. He made his List A debut for Papua New Guinea against Oman in the 2019 ICC World Cricket League Division Two tournament on 26 April 2019. Papua New Guinea finished in the top four places in the tournament, therefore gaining One Day International (ODI) status. Atai made his ODI debut for Papua New Guinea on 27 April 2019, against the United States, in the tournament's third-place playoff.

He made his Twenty20 International (T20I) debut for Papua New Guinea on 8 July 2019, against Samoa, in the men's tournament at the 2019 Pacific Games. In September 2019, he was named in Papua New Guinea's squad for the 2019 ICC T20 World Cup Qualifier tournament in the United Arab Emirates. In August 2021, Atai was named in Papua New Guinea's squad for the 2021 ICC Men's T20 World Cup.

References

External links
 

1999 births
Living people
Papua New Guinean cricketers
Papua New Guinea One Day International cricketers
Papua New Guinea Twenty20 International cricketers
Place of birth missing (living people)